Angélique Berthenet-Hidalgo (born September 18, 1976) is a retired amateur French freestyle wrestler, who competed in the women's flyweight category. Considering one of the world's top female freestyle wrestlers in her decade, Berthenet has claimed a silver medal in the 47-kg division at the 1996 World Wrestling Championships in Sofia, Bulgaria, produced a staggering tally of five medals (one gold and four bronze) at the European Championships, and offered a chance to represent her country France at the 2004 Summer Olympics. Throughout her sporting career, Berthenet trained full-time for Dammarie Sport Wrestling Club, under her personal coach Ryszard Chelmowski.

Berthenet made sporting headlines at the 1996 World Wrestling Championships in Sofia, Bulgaria, where she picked up a silver medal in the women's 47-kg division, losing out to U.S. wrestler Tricia Saunders. On that same year, she took home her first European championship title in the same category, and continued to produce four more medals (1997, 1998, 2002, and 2003) in her career hardware. Eventually, she entered the 2003 World Wrestling Championships in New York City, New York, United States, and came strong as a top medal contender in her category. Though she finished sixth in the women's flyweight, Berthenet granted a ticket to her first Olympics and was officially selected to the French Olympic team.

When women's wrestling made its debut at the 2004 Summer Olympics in Athens, Berthenet seized her opportunity to compete in the inaugural 48 kg class. In the prelim pool, Berthenet opened her match by dismantling Mongolia's Tsogtbazaryn Enkhjargal with a 7–4 decision, and then easily pinned Guinea-Bissau's Leopoldina Ross within the first minute to secure a spot in the semifinals. She lost the next day's semifinal match 12–0 in superb fashion to Japan's Chiharu Icho, and could not hold an early lead to throw U.S. wrestler Patricia Miranda off the mat with a tough, 4–12 decision for the bronze medal, dropping her position to fourth.

References

External links
 Profile – International Wrestling Database
 

1976 births
Living people
French female sport wrestlers
Olympic wrestlers of France
Wrestlers at the 2004 Summer Olympics
Sportspeople from Melun
World Wrestling Championships medalists
European Wrestling Championships medalists
20th-century French women
21st-century French women